This is the main page for the alphabetized list of former members of the United States House of Representatives, which is accessible by using the above template.  The list is incomplete.

The number of former members of the House is at least 11,026.

Number of years/terms representative/delegate has served
The number of years the representative/delegate has served in Congress indicates the number of terms the representative has.

Note the representative/delegate can also serve non-consecutive terms if the representative loses election and wins re-election to the House.
 2 years - 1 term 
 4 years - 2 terms 
 6 years - 3 terms 
 8 years - 4 terms 
 10 years - 5 terms
 12 years - 6 terms 
 14 years - 7 terms
 16 years - 8 terms 
 18 years - 9 terms 
 20 years - 10 terms 
 22 years - 11 terms 
 24 years - 12 terms 
 26 years - 13 terms 
 28 years - 14 terms 
 30 years - 15 terms 
 32 years - 16 terms 
 34 years - 17 terms 
 36 years - 18 terms 
 38 years - 19 terms 
 40 years - 20 terms 
 42 years - 21 terms 
 44 years - 22 terms 
 46 years - 23 terms 
 48 years - 24 terms 
 50 years - 25 terms 
 52 years - 26 terms 
 54 years - 27 terms 
 56 years - 28 terms 
 58 years - 29 terms

External links
 Congressional Biographical Directory